Endotricha ragonoti is a species of snout moth in the genus Endotricha. It was described by Hugo Theodor Christoph, in 1893. It is found from the Tian Shan mountains to northern India and China (Xinjiang).

The wingspan is 18–18.5 mm.

References

Moths described in 1893
Endotrichini